Kokrajhar is a town in the Bodoland Territorial Region, an autonomous territory in Assam, one of the North Eastern states of India.

Kokrajhar town is located along the bank of the river Gaurang. The North East Indian Railways divides the city into two divisions, north and the south Kokrajhar. Kokrajhar town is the headquarters of Kokrajhar district and the Bodoland Territorial Council (BTC).

Geography
It has an average elevation of 38 metres (124 feet).

Climate

Demographics 

 Indian census, Kokrajhar had a population of 31,152. Males constitute 52% of the population and females constitute 48% of the population. Kokrajhar has an average literacy rate of 79%, higher than the national average of 71%: male literacy is 84%, and female literacy is 74%. In Kokrajhar, 10% of the population is under 6 years of age. The district has 3 sub divisions Kokrajhar, Gossaigaon and Basugaon.

Language

Bengali is the most spoken language at 18,130 speakers, followed by Bodo at 8,549, Assamese is spoken by 2,752 people and Hindi at 4,024.

Transportation

Kokrajhar is served by the government owned Assam State Transport Corporation, Bodoland Transport Services and many private bus operators.

The Kokrajhar railway station lies on the New Jalpaiguri–New Bongaigaon section of Barauni–Guwahati line under the Northeast Frontier Railway with services to important cities of the country like Guwahati, Kolkata, New Delhi, Mumbai, Chennai etc.

Important trains like Rajdhani Express, Kamrup Express, Brahmaputra Mail, North East Express, Vivek Express, Garib Rath Express, Avadh Assam Express etc. have their stoppage at Kokrajhar railway station.

Education
The town has many schools and colleges with English being the sole medium of instruction in higher education. All the colleges under the jurisdiction of Bodoland Territorial Council is affiliated under Bodoland University since 2017.

Secondary schools
 Rashtra Bhasha Vidyapith Hindi high School
Don Bosco School, Kokrajhar
U. N. Academy, Kokrajhar
D N Himatsingka High School

Universities and Colleges
Bodoland University, Kokrajhar
Kokrajhar Government College
Commerce College, Kokrajhar 
Girls' College, Kokrajhar
Science College, Kokrajhar
Bineswar Brahma Engineering College, Kokrajhar
Central Institute of Technology, Kokrajhar

Politics
Kokrajhar consists of three assembly constituencies: Kokrajhar East, Kokrajhar West and Gossaigaon, which all are part of Kokrajhar (Lok Sabha constituency).

Notable personalities
Halicharan Narzary, national footballer
Hagrama Mohilary, ex chief of BTC and chairperson of Bodoland People's Front
Durga Boro, footballer
Bineshwar Brahma, politician, poet, teacher

See also
Kokrajhar (Lok Sabha constituency)

References

 
Cities and towns in Kokrajhar district
Bodoland